Nuit #1 is a 2011 Canadian drama film directed by Anne Émond.

Plot 
Clara (Catherine De Léan) and Nikolai (Dimitri Storoge) meet at a sweat-soaked rave and end their night at his apartment. The first part of the film is an erotic and candid portrait of their lovemaking, When Clara tries to sneak out without saying goodbye, this typical hookup takes an unexpected turn.

Awards/nominations
 2011 Vancouver International Film Festival award for Best Canadian Film - Won (Anne Émond)
 2012 Genie Award for Best Performance by an Actress in a Leading Role - Nominee (Catherine De Léan)
 2012 Genie Award for Best Original Screenplay - Nominee (Anne Émond)
 2012 Claude Jutra Award for best film by a first-time director - Won
 2012 Prix collégial du cinéma québécois - nominee

References

External links 
 
 

2011 films
Canadian drama films
Best First Feature Genie and Canadian Screen Award-winning films
Films directed by Anne Émond
2011 directorial debut films
French-language Canadian films
2010s Canadian films